Tampakan, officially the Municipality of Tampakan (Jawi: ايڠايد نو تمڤاكن), is a 2nd class municipality in the province of South Cotabato, Philippines. According to the 2020 census, it has a population of 41,018 people.

Geography

Barangays
Tampakan is politically subdivided into 14 barangays.
Albagan
Buto
Danlag
Kipalbig
Lambayong
Liberty
Lampitak
Maltana
Poblacion
Palo
Pula Bato
San Isidro
Santa Cruz
Tablu

Climate

Demographics

Religion
Churches in Tampakan:

Lifehouse Community of Faith, Inc. (SBC), Brgy. Poblacion
Greenland Community Church (SBC), Brgy. Buto
Greenview Baptist Church (SBC), Brgy. Buto
Amazing Grace Baptist Church (SBC), Brgy. Maltana
Snip Baptist Church (SBC), Brgy. Tablu
Liberty Baptist Church (SBC), Brgy. Liberty
Seventh-Day Adventist Church, Brgy. Sta. Cruz
Kingdom Hall of Jehovah's Witnesses, Brgy. Poblacion
Born Again Sanctuary of Praise, Brgy. Poblacion
Iglesia Ni Cristo, Brgy. Poblacion

Economy 

There is a proposed copper and gold mine in Tampakan. Once approved for operations, the Tampakan Copper-Gold Project will be the largest in the Philippines and among the largest copper mines in the world.

The local government of Tampakan has for now cancelled its agreement with Sagittarius Mines to develop the reserves into a mine in 2020 alleging that the terms of the deal is lopsided against residents and the community

References

External links
Tampakan Profile at PhilAtlas.com
Tampakan Profile at the DTI Cities and Municipalities Competitive Index
[ Philippine Standard Geographic Code]
Philippine Census Information

Municipalities of South Cotabato